Güejar River is a river of Colombia. It is part of the Orinoco River basin.

Geography 
Güejar River flows from the Cordillera Oriental.

See also
List of rivers of Colombia

References

Rivers of Colombia